The Klinke Brothers Ice Cream Company is a corporation headquartered in Memphis, Tennessee. As of 2009, it is a supplier to 208 Baskin Robbins stores in eight U.S. states.

History
Klinke Brothers originally made the "Angel Food" brand products. In 2006, it had discontinued manufacturing the product, and licensed the brand to Yarnell Ice Cream Co. (Yarnell's). The Memphis Business Journal stated that "The Angel Food brand has been a longtime best seller in Tennessee, Mississippi and southwest Kentucky." Klinke Brothers began focusing more on its Baskin Robbins franchising operations.

Corporate affairs
Its offices are along Interstate 240, between Airways and Lamar. They are visible from aircraft traveling to and from Memphis International Airport.

A large ice cream tub was installed at the headquarters in July 1987. Preston Klinke said that John Malmo, an advertising executive from Memphis the tub had a price tag of over $15,000 and that it paid for itself after the first six months. Due to the sale of the Angel Food brand, the tub was changed to a Baskin Robbins tub in 2009. The company Design Team from Savannah, Tennessee changed the logo in three days. It used a crane to move the tub to a parking lot, swapped the logos, and moved it back to its original position.

References

Ice cream brands
Manufacturing companies based in Memphis, Tennessee